An American Viticultural Area (AVA) is a designated appellation for American wine in the United States distinguishable by geographic, geologic, and climatic features, with boundaries defined by the Alcohol and Tobacco Tax and Trade Bureau (TTB) of the United States Department of the Treasury. As of August 2022, there are 267 recognized AVAs in 34 states—several of which are shared by two or more states. Over half (147) of the AVAs are in California.

The Augusta AVA near the town of Augusta, Missouri, was the first recognized AVA, gaining the status on June 20, 1980.

Arizona

Sonoita AVA
Verde Valley AVA
Willcox AVA

Arkansas

Altus AVA
Arkansas Mountain AVA
Ozark Mountain AVA (shared with Missouri and Oklahoma)

California

Cascade Foothills
These AVAs are located in far northern California, east of Redding.
Inwood Valley AVA
Manton Valley AVA

Central Coast and Santa Cruz Mountains
All of these AVAs are included in the geographic boundaries of the Central Coast AVA with the exceptions of Ben Lomond Mountain AVA and Santa Cruz Mountains AVA, which are surrounded by, but are specifically excluded from, the larger regional AVA.
 Adelaida District AVA
 Alisos Canyon AVA
 Arroyo Grande Valley AVA
 Arroyo Seco AVA
 Ballard Canyon AVA
 Ben Lomond Mountain AVA
 Carmel Valley AVA
 Central Coast AVA
 Chalone AVA
 Cienega Valley AVA
 Creston District AVA
 Edna Valley AVA
 El Pomar District AVA
 Gabilan Mountains AVA (effective 9/14/2022)
 Hames Valley AVA
 Happy Canyon of Santa Barbara AVA
 Lamorinda AVA
 Lime Kiln Valley AVA
 Livermore Valley AVA
 Los Olivos District AVA
 Monterey AVA
 Mt. Harlan AVA
 Pacheco Pass AVA
 Paicines AVA
 Paso Robles AVA
 Paso Robles Estrella District AVA
 Paso Robles Geneseo District AVA
 Paso Robles Highlands District AVA
 Paso Robles Willow Creek District AVA
 San Antonio Valley AVA
 San Benito AVA
 San Bernabe AVA
 San Francisco Bay AVA
 San Juan Creek AVA
 San Lucas AVA
 San Luis Obispo Coast AVA
 San Miguel District AVA
 San Ysidro District AVA
 Santa Clara Valley AVA
 Santa Cruz Mountains AVA
 Santa Lucia Highlands AVA
 Santa Margarita Ranch AVA
 Santa Maria Valley AVA
 Santa Ynez Valley AVA
 Sta. Rita Hills AVA
 Templeton Gap District AVA
 York Mountain AVA

Central Valley
Unlike other regions of California, there is no large regional AVA designation that includes the entire Central Valley wine growing region.
 Alta Mesa AVA
 Borden Ranch AVA
 Capay Valley AVA
 Clarksburg AVA
 Clements Hills AVA
 Cosumnes River AVA
 Diablo Grande AVA
 Dunnigan Hills AVA
 Jahant AVA
 Lodi AVA
 Madera AVA
 Merritt Island AVA
 Mokelumne River AVA
 Paulsell Valley AVA
 River Junction AVA
 Salado Creek AVA
 Sloughhouse AVA
 Squaw Valley-Miramonte AVA
 Tracy Hills AVA

Klamath Mountains
These AVAs are located in the southern Klamath Mountains of far northwestern California.
 Seiad Valley AVA
 Trinity Lakes AVA
 Willow Creek AVA

North Coast
All of these AVAs are included within the geographic boundaries of the six-county North Coast AVA.
 Alexander Valley AVA
 Anderson Valley AVA
 Atlas Peak AVA
 Benmore Valley AVA
 Bennett Valley AVA
 Big Valley District-Lake County AVA
 Calistoga AVA
 Chalk Hill AVA
 Chiles Valley AVA
 Clear Lake AVA
 Cole Ranch AVA
 Coombsville AVA
 Covelo AVA
 Diamond Mountain District AVA
 Dos Rios AVA
 Dry Creek Valley AVA
 Eagle Peak Mendocino County AVA
 Fort Ross-Seaview AVA
 Fountaingrove District AVA
 Green Valley of Russian River Valley AVA
 Guenoc Valley AVA
 High Valley AVA
 Howell Mountain AVA
 Kelsey Bench-Lake County AVA
 Knights Valley AVA
 Los Carneros AVA
 McDowell Valley AVA
 Mendocino AVA
 Mendocino Ridge AVA
 Moon Mountain District Sonoma County AVA
 Mt. Veeder AVA
 Napa Valley AVA
 North Coast AVA
 Northern Sonoma AVA
 Oak Knoll District of Napa Valley AVA
 Oakville AVA
 Petaluma Gap AVA
 Pine Mountain-Cloverdale Peak AVA
 Potter Valley AVA
 Red Hills Lake County AVA
 Redwood Valley AVA
 Rockpile AVA
 Russian River Valley AVA
 Rutherford AVA
 Solano County Green Valley AVA
 Sonoma Coast AVA
 Sonoma Mountain AVA
 Sonoma Valley AVA
 Spring Mountain District AVA
 St. Helena AVA
 Stags Leap District AVA
 Suisun Valley AVA
 Upper Lake Valley AVA
 West Sonoma Coast AVA
 Wild Horse Valley AVA
 Yorkville Highlands AVA
 Yountville AVA

Sierra Foothills
All of these AVAs are contained entirely within the geographic boundaries of the Sierra Foothills AVA.
 California Shenandoah Valley AVA
 El Dorado AVA
 Fair Play AVA
 Fiddletown AVA
 North Yuba AVA
 Sierra Foothills AVA

South Coast
 Antelope Valley of the California High Desert AVA
 Cucamonga Valley AVA
 Leona Valley AVA
 Malibu Coast AVA
 Malibu-Newton Canyon AVA
 Ramona Valley AVA
 Palos Verdes Peninsula AVA
 Saddle Rock-Malibu AVA
 San Pasqual Valley AVA
 Sierra Pelona Valley AVA
 South Coast AVA
 Tehachapi Mountains AVA
 Temecula Valley AVA

Colorado

Grand Valley AVA
West Elks AVA

Connecticut

Eastern Connecticut Highlands AVA
Southeastern New England AVA (shared with Massachusetts and Rhode Island)
Western Connecticut Highlands AVA

Georgia

Dahlonega Plateau AVA
Upper Hiwassee Highlands AVA (shared with North Carolina)

Hawaii

Ulupalakua AVA

Idaho

Eagle Foothills AVA
Lewis-Clark Valley AVA (shared with Washington)
Snake River Valley AVA (shared with Oregon)

Illinois

Shawnee Hills AVA
Upper Mississippi River Valley AVA (shared with Iowa, Minnesota, and Wisconsin)

Indiana

Indiana Uplands AVA
Ohio River Valley AVA (shared with Kentucky, Ohio, and West Virginia)

Iowa

Loess Hills District AVA (shared with Missouri)
Upper Mississippi River Valley AVA (shared with Illinois, Minnesota, and Wisconsin)

Kentucky

Ohio River Valley AVA (shared with Indiana, Ohio, and West Virginia)

Louisiana

Mississippi Delta AVA (shared with Mississippi and Tennessee)

Maryland

Catoctin AVA
Cumberland Valley AVA (shared with Pennsylvania)
Linganore AVA

Massachusetts

Martha's Vineyard AVA
Southeastern New England AVA (shared with Connecticut and Rhode Island)

Michigan

Fennville AVA
Lake Michigan Shore AVA
Leelanau Peninsula AVA
Old Mission Peninsula AVA
Tip of the Mitt AVA

Minnesota

Alexandria Lakes AVA
Upper Mississippi River Valley AVA (shared with Illinois, Iowa, and Wisconsin)

Mississippi

Mississippi Delta AVA (shared with Louisiana and Tennessee)

Missouri

Augusta AVA
Hermann AVA
Loess Hills District AVA (shared with Iowa)
Ozark Highlands AVA
Ozark Mountain AVA (shared with Arkansas and Oklahoma)

New Jersey

Cape May Peninsula AVA
Central Delaware Valley AVA (shared with Pennsylvania)
Outer Coastal Plain AVA
Warren Hills AVA

New Mexico

Mesilla Valley AVA (shared with Texas)
Middle Rio Grande Valley AVA
Mimbres Valley AVA

New York

Cayuga Lake AVA
Champlain Valley of New York AVA
Finger Lakes AVA
Hudson River Region AVA
Lake Erie AVA (shared with Ohio and Pennsylvania)
Long Island AVA
Niagara Escarpment AVA
North Fork of Long Island AVA
Seneca Lake AVA
The Hamptons, Long Island AVA
Upper Hudson AVA

North Carolina

Appalachian High Country AVA (shared with Tennessee and Virginia)
Crest of the Blue Ridge Henderson County AVA
Haw River Valley AVA
Swan Creek AVA
Upper Hiwassee Highlands AVA (shared with Georgia)
Yadkin Valley AVA

Ohio

Grand River Valley AVA
Isle St. George AVA
Lake Erie AVA (shared with New York and Pennsylvania)
Loramie Creek AVA
Ohio River Valley AVA (shared with Indiana, Kentucky, and West Virginia)

Oklahoma

Ozark Mountain AVA (shared with Arkansas and Missouri)

Oregon

Applegate Valley AVA
Chehalem Mountains AVA
Columbia Gorge AVA (shared with Washington)
Columbia Valley AVA (shared with Washington)
Dundee Hills AVA
Elkton Oregon AVA
Eola-Amity Hills AVA
Laurelwood District AVA
Lower Long Tom AVA
McMinnville AVA
Mount Pisgah, Polk County, Oregon AVA
Red Hill Douglas County, Oregon AVA
Ribbon Ridge AVA
The Rocks District of Milton-Freewater AVA
Rogue Valley AVA
Snake River Valley AVA (shared with Idaho)
Southern Oregon AVA
Tualatin Hills AVA
Umpqua Valley AVA
Van Duzer Corridor AVA
Walla Walla Valley AVA (shared with Washington)
Willamette Valley AVA
Yamhill-Carlton AVA

Pennsylvania

Central Delaware Valley AVA (shared with New Jersey)
Cumberland Valley AVA (shared with Maryland)
Lake Erie AVA (shared with New York and Ohio)
Lancaster Valley AVA
Lehigh Valley AVA

Rhode Island

Southeastern New England AVA (shared with Connecticut and Massachusetts)

Tennessee

Appalachian High Country AVA (shared with North Carolina and Virginia)
Mississippi Delta AVA (shared with Louisiana and Mississippi)

Texas

Bell Mountain AVA
Escondido Valley AVA
Fredericksburg in the Texas Hill Country AVA
Mesilla Valley AVA (shared with New Mexico)
Texas Davis Mountains AVA
Texas High Plains AVA
Texas Hill Country AVA
Texoma AVA

Virginia

Appalachian High Country AVA (shared with North Carolina and Tennessee)
Middleburg Virginia AVA
Monticello AVA
North Fork of Roanoke AVA
Northern Neck George Washington Birthplace AVA
Rocky Knob AVA
Shenandoah Valley AVA (shared with West Virginia)
Virginia's Eastern Shore AVA
Virginia Peninsula AVA

Washington

Ancient Lakes of the Columbia Valley AVA
Candy Mountain AVA
Columbia Gorge AVA (shared with Oregon)
Columbia Valley AVA (shared with Oregon)
Goose Gap AVA 
Horse Heaven Hills AVA
Lake Chelan AVA
Lewis-Clark Valley AVA (shared with Idaho)
Naches Heights AVA
Puget Sound AVA
Rattlesnake Hills AVA
Red Mountain AVA
Rocky Reach AVA
Royal Slope AVA
Snipes Mountain AVA
The Burn of Columbia Valley AVA 
Wahluke Slope AVA
Walla Walla Valley AVA (shared with Oregon)
White Bluffs AVA 
Yakima Valley AVA

West Virginia

Kanawha River Valley AVA
Ohio River Valley AVA (shared with Indiana, Kentucky, and Ohio)
Shenandoah Valley AVA (shared with Virginia)

Wisconsin

Lake Wisconsin AVA
Upper Mississippi River Valley AVA (shared with Illinois, Iowa, and Minnesota)
Wisconsin Ledge AVA

References

Appellations
Wine-related lists
Wine classification
United States geography-related lists